Thomas Samuel Manzella, Jr. (born April 16, 1983) is an American former professional baseball shortstop. He played in Major League Baseball (MLB) for the Houston Astros.

Early career

High school
Manzella was born in Chalmette, Louisiana and attended Archbishop Hannan High School, and was a three-year starting shortstop.  He earned All-District 8-4A, All-St. Bernard Parish and academic all-state honors each year. He hit .360 with 3 home runs and 24 RBIs during his senior season. He was selected to play in the LHSAA All-Star Game, and earned St. Bernard Parish Most Outstanding Player recognition as a senior.

NCAA
Manzella attended Tulane University and played for the Tulane Green Wave baseball team. He played in 55 games as a true freshman, mostly at shortstop, and led the team with 135 assists while finishing fifth on the team with a batting average .294. He earned All-Tournament honors at the 2002 Conference USA Tournament after hitting .615 (8-for-13) with a double and five RBIs during the tournament. In 2003, he started all 59 games at second base and received honorable-mention All-Louisiana honors after tying for the team lead in doubles (20) while ranking tied for second in RBIs (44). Manzella was again named to the C-USA All-Tournament Team after hitting .615 (8-for-13) with an RBI, a walk, and a stolen base.

In 2004, he was the only player on the team to start at the same position in all 62 games, and earned second-team All-Louisiana honors after leading the team in assists (185) and sacrifice bunts (school-record 12) while ranking second in steals (11). He was named to NCAA Oxford Regional All-Tournament Team after hitting .417 (5-for-12) with three RBIs and two sacrifice bunts, and posted nine putouts and nine assists while helping turn three double plays defensively. In 2005, he started all 65 games at shortstop and earned first-team All-Conference USA honors after leading the team in batting average (.356), hits (98), stolen bases (21) and assists (171), while tying for first in doubles (24), ranking second in RBIs (62), third in total bases (150), fourth in slugging percentage (.545) and runs scored (58), and fifth in home runs (eight). He led C-USA in hits and stolen bases. In the NCAA New Orleans Super Regional, Manzella started all three games at shortstop, hitting .400 (6-for-15) with two doubles and two RBIs and posted a .417 on-base percentage with a walk. He had two hits in all three games, and posted seven putouts, five assists, and one error defensively.

Collegiate summer baseball
In 2002, he earned All-Valley League honors as a shortstop and was named to the All Star Game roster as he led his team with nine stolen bases, and finished second on the club in batting average (.313) and doubles (5). In 2003, he led the Whitecaps in assists while collecting three doubles, a triple, six RBIs and four stolen bases.

Professional career

Houston Astros
He was drafted by the Astros in the 3rd round of the 2005 Major League Baseball draft.  Manzella went on to play for the Tri-City ValleyCats of the New York–Penn League. He played in 53 games and finished with a .232 batting average in 220 at-bats with 18 RBIs, and 5 stolen bases.

In , Manzella split time between the Salem Avalanche and Corpus Christi Hooks, playing in 121 games with a .264 combined batting average in 451 at bats with 1 home run, 39 RBIs, and 15 stolen bases.

In , Manzella played in 54 games with the Hooks before being promoted to the Triple-A Round Rock Express, where he struggled with a .219 batting average with 0 home runs and 15 RBIs, but had his best fielding percentage at .989.

The Astros signed Manzella to a one-year, $400,000 major league contract on February 15 after having added him to the 40-man roster in November to protect him from the Rule 5 draft. He was called up to the major leagues along with Chris Johnson and Billy Sadler by the Astros from the Round Rock Express. He recorded his first major league hit, off of Donnie Veal of the Pirates, on September 11.

Manzella was the Opening Day shortstop with the Astros in 2010, and Jeff Keppinger also got time there when he wasn't at second base. He went 13-58 (.224) with 3 RBI in April. He hit his first major league home run, a 2-run home run off of Rodrigo López of the Diamondbacks, on May 5, putting the Astros on top 2-1 in a game they eventually won 3-2. He hit .192 (14-73) with 5 RBI in May. When the Astros placed Kazuo Matsui on waivers on May 20, Keppinger took over full-time at second base, making Manzella the full-time shortstop. He was hitting .224 (13-58) in June before he fractured his left index finger on June 22 when Nate Schierholtz slid into it trying to steal second base. The Astros recalled Oswaldo Navarro to take over at shortstop, but they eventually acquired Ángel Sánchez to take over on July 1. He rehabbed at Corpus Christi and Round Rock for 11 games total before returning on August 19. He finished the year splitting time with Sánchez at shortstop. In 83 games with the Astros, he hit .225 with 1 HR, 21 RBI and a .973 fielding percentage.

Manzella was cut from 2011 spring training on March 24, and Matt Downs and Joe Inglett were the backup infielders to start 2011, while Sánchez was the shortstop. Manzella began 2011 with Triple-A Oklahoma City. With Clint Barmes established as the starting shortstop, and Sánchez as his backup, Manzella had no role on the major league roster, and on August 10, 2011, he was designated for assignment. In 109 games with Oklahoma City, he hit .230 with 7 HR and 48 RBI.

Arizona Diamondbacks
Manzella was claimed off waivers by the Arizona Diamondbacks on August 11. He was assigned to Triple-A Reno, where in 22 games to finish 2011, he hit .246 with 1 HR, 3 RBI and 7 runs. After not being called up when the rosters expanded in September, he was designated for assignment on September 19 and outrighted 2 days later.

Manzella began 2012 with Reno, where he played in 15 games before being released on May 6. He was hitting 4-40 with 2 RBI and 2 runs.

Milwaukee Brewers
Manzella was signed to a minor league contract on May 8, 2012 by the Milwaukee Brewers.  He provided depth in the infield after injuries to Alex González and Mat Gamel. On July 29, 2012, Manzella was released by Double-A Huntsville. He was hitting .252 with 1 HR and 28 RBI in 62 games.

Chicago White Sox
On July 31, 2012, Manzella signed a minor league deal with the Chicago White Sox. He was assigned to the Triple-A Charlotte the following day. He played in 14 games for the Knights, where he hit 7-41 with 6 RBI and 4 runs. After the season, he became a minor league free agent.

Colorado Rockies
On December 13, 2012, Manzella signed a minor league deal with the Colorado Rockies. Manzella began the 2013 season with Colorado`s Triple-A affiliate Colorado Springs and appeared in 32 games, but was released after batting .190 in 32 games with no home runs and 10 RBIs.

Toronto Blue Jays
The Blue Jays signed Manzella on June 4, 2013, and assigned him to their Double-A affiliate New Hampshire Fisher Cats.  He started for the Fisher Cats at third base on June 4. He was released on August 5. In 21 games with New Hampshire, he hit .265 with 10 RBI and 10 runs.

Second stint with White Sox
Manzella signed a minor league deal with the Chicago White Sox on August 12, 2013, and started at shortstop for the Double-A Birmingham Barons that night. On August 30, 2013, after batting .059 through 34 at bats, Manzella was released.

Arizona Diamondbacks
Manzella signed a minor league deal with the Arizona Diamondbacks in January 2014.

References

External links

1983 births
Living people
Major League Baseball shortstops
Houston Astros players
Tulane Green Wave baseball players
Brewster Whitecaps players
Tri-City ValleyCats players
Lexington Legends players
Salem Avalanche players
Corpus Christi Hooks players
Round Rock Express players
Águilas Cibaeñas players
American expatriate baseball players in the Dominican Republic
Oklahoma City RedHawks players
Reno Aces players
Huntsville Stars players
Charlotte Knights players
Colorado Springs Sky Sox players
New Hampshire Fisher Cats players
Birmingham Barons players
Baseball players from Louisiana
People from Chalmette, Louisiana
People from St. Tammany Parish, Louisiana